Robin Hood's Well is a historic building beside the A1(M) motorway in Skellow, South Yorkshire, England. It was originally built in 1710 as a well house over a spring alongside the old Great North Road, but the structure was moved to its present location alongside the Doncaster By-Pass in what is known as Barnsdale (sometimes Barnsdale Forest).

Naming
The ballad "Robin Hood and the Curtal Friar" gives the figure of Robin Hood a connection to fountains, which may account for the original naming of the spring where the well was established. The well itself was given the name "Robin Hood's Well" by Charles Howard, 3rd Earl of Carlisle, who had the well named after the figure in an attempt to solidify the area's identity as the home of the legends.

Description
Robin Hood's Well is an ornamental well cover that was designed by Sir John Vanbrugh in 1710 for the 3rd Earl of Carlisle. The stone that makes up the well cover is finely cut, ashlar Magnesian Limestone. Three of its sides are made up of arched entrances with pendant keystones. Originally the well was built as a stepwell sourced from a spring alongside a park wall, with the spring lying at the base of some steps under the structure. The spring was buried in 1960 during the construction of the Doncaster By-Pass and the well was relocated away from its original location, being placed alongside the highway on a concrete foundation. After its relocation the structure was rehabilitated in 1993 with a stainless-steel frame to ensure its prolonged survival.

History
The stone structure known today as Robin Hood's Well was designed by Sir John Vanbrugh in 1710. It was erected to the east of the Great North Road. Barnsdale Forest had been associated with the legend of Robin Hood for centuries at the time of its construction, so Charles Howard, 3rd Earl of Carlisle had the well named after the figure in an attempt to solidify the area's identity as the home of the myths. The well house was moved from its original location during the construction of the Doncaster By-Pass in 1960. Hence it is no longer a real well, and now rests upon a solid concrete base. After its relocation it was listed as a Grade II building on 5 June 1968, affording it protections due to its historic value.

See also
 Little John's Well
 Listed buildings in Burghwallis

References

External links

  Robin Hood's Well, Skellow
 Robin Hood's Well on an OS map

Grade II listed buildings in South Yorkshire
Robin Hood
Doncaster
Water wells in England